Jeolgang Jang clan is one of the Korean clans. Their Bon-gwan is in Zhejiang, China. According to the research held in 2000, the number of Jeolgang Jang clan’s member was 3300. Their founder was  who was from Hang Prefecture, Zhejiang. He was a general and was dispatched to Joseon as a follower of Wu Weizhong working as Ming dynasty general, but he was not able to come back to China because he was shot during Siege of Ulsan. As a result, he was naturalized in Joseon. After that, ’s descendant officially began Jeolgang Jang clan and made Zhejiang, Jeolgang Jang clan’s Bon-gwan.

See also 
 Korean clan names of foreign origin

References

External links 
 

 
Korean clan names of Chinese origin
Jang clans